This is a list of chapters, in their volumes, for the manga series, Air Gear. The series ended at volume 37. totaling 357 chapters, released on July 17, 2012. In North America, the series was licensed by Del Rey and, after its shut down, by Kodansha USA.


Volume list

References

External links

Air Gear